Humsafar Express is a fully premium service with AC-3 Tier and Sleeper class accommodation having all the modern facilities designed and operated by Indian Railways. The fares of Humsafar Express at the time of launch are around 15–20% higher compared to normal AC-3 tier and Sleeper class fares.

Features 
The features included for its fleets are:

 In the month of September 2019, Railways decided to add Sleeper class to provide better service to middle class passengers.
 Railways has added a changing table for babies in the toilet.
 Vending machines are installed for tea, coffee and milk.
 110 V DC electric ports and USB ports are provided for each passenger.
 Reading lights for each passenger.
 More comfortable berths than the previous 3-tier AC sleeper rakes.
 Seat-number stickers are braille-integrated.
 Each compartment has Bio-toilets fitted for proper disposal of human waste.
 The exterior of coaches has a futuristic look with the use of Vinyl sheets.
 GPS-based passenger information system at each end of the coach to display speed and station information on LED displays with voice announcements.
 Compartments are equipped with smoke alarms and CCTV cameras to enhance passenger security.
 Heating chamber and refrigerating box are installed in each coach to preserve the food that was brought from home by the passengers.
 Curtains to maintain privacy and a dustbin to maintain cleanliness is provided in each cabin.
 Each coach has three odour control systems fitted across the aisle.
 Automatic doors
 Khadi bedrolls are provided.

Active services

See also
 Mumbai–Ahmedabad high-speed rail corridor
 Vande Bharat Express
 Antyodaya Express
 Tejas Express
 Uday Express
 Mahamana Express

References

External links

Railway services introduced in 2016